Qarah Cheshmeh (also Romanized as Qareh Cheshmeh) is a village in Chehel Chay Rural District, in the Central District of Minudasht County, Golestan Province, Iran. At the 2006 census, its population was 2,756, in 622 families.

References 

Populated places in Minudasht County